This is a list of students' associations in British Columbia, Canada.

See also
List of Canadian students' associations

References